Senez is a commune in the Alpes-de-Haute-Provence department in southeastern France.

Ecclesiastical history
Marcellus I, the first known bishop of Senez, attended the Council of Agde in 506 CE; nevertheless, Senez must have been an episcopal city as early as 439 CE.

Jean IV Soanen, the Oratorian, noted for his opposition to the Bull "Unigenitus", was Bishop of Senez from 1696 until the time of his deposition in 1727.

By the Concordat of 1801, the diocese of Digne was made to include the two departments of the Hautes-Alpes and Basses Alpes, in addition to the former diocese of Digne, the archdiocese of Embrun, the dioceses of Gap, Sisteron, and Senez, a very considerable part of the diocese of Glandèves and diocese of Riez, and fourteen parishes in the Archdiocese of Aix and the Diocese of Apt.

In 1822 Gap was made an episcopal see and, thus divested of the department of the Hautes Alpes, the present diocese of Digne covers the territory formerly included in the dioceses of Digne, Senez, Glandèves, Riez, and Sisteron.

Population

See also
 Senez Cathedral
Communes of the Alpes-de-Haute-Provence department

References

Communes of Alpes-de-Haute-Provence
Alpes-de-Haute-Provence communes articles needing translation from French Wikipedia